A guitar is a fretted and stringed musical instrument.

An electric guitar is a guitar that uses electromagnetic induction to convert vibrations of its strings into electric signals.

Guitar(s) may also refer to:

Music

Albums
 Guitar (Peter Lang album), 2003
 Guitar (Tony Rice album), 1970
 Guitar (Sonny Sharrock album), 1986
 Guitar (Frank Zappa album), 1988
 Guitars (Aka Moon album), 2002
 Guitars (Mike Oldfield album), 1999
 Guitars (McCoy Tyner album), 2008

Songs
 "Guitar" (song), by Prince from his 2007 album Planet Earth
 "Guitar", from the 1998 album Prolonging the Magic by Cake
 "Guitar", from the 2004 album Culture Vulture by Jesus Jones
 "The Guitar (The Lion Sleeps Tonight)", by They Might Be Giants

People
 Bonnie Guitar (1923–2019), American musician, singer, and businesswoman
 Guitar (nickname), people nicknamed "Guitar"

Other uses
 The Guitar (film), a 2008 American drama
 Guitar, a musical project of German musician Michael Lückner
 Guitar, a character in Song of Solomon, a 1977 novel by Toni Morrison

See also 
 The Guitar (disambiguation)
 Alto guitar (disambiguation)
 Acoustic guitar
 Five-string guitar (disambiguation)
Flamenco guitar
 Eight-string guitar
 Eleven-string alto guitar